Ugly Season is the sixth studio album by American singer-songwriter Perfume Genius, released June 17, 2022, by Matador Records. The album was originally composed as a musical accompaniment for choreographer Kate Wallich's contemporary dance piece The Sun Still Burns Here.

Short film 
The album was accompanied by a short film titled Pygmalion's Ugly Season, directed by visual artist Jacolby Satterwhite, featuring the music of the album and an appearance by Perfume Genius.

Reception

Year-end lists

Track listing

Personnel
 Perfume Genius – vocals, synthesizer (1, 3, 6-10), piano (1, 10)
 Blake Mills – production, mixing, bass (3, 7), bass drum (8), celesta (1, 2), chimes (3), clarinet (3, 5, 6), drum machine (2), synth guitar (2), drums (4), electric piano (1), guitar (2-4, 6-9), harmonium (1, 2, 10), Mellotron (2, 8), percussion (4, 6, 8), piano (1-4), synthesizer (3, 4), drum programming (7)
 Alan Wyffels – additional vocals (4), chimes (3, 4), flute (2), piano (3-5), synthesizer (7, 8)
 Rob Moose – strings, string arrangement (1)
 Sam Gendel – saxophone (2-4, 8)
 Matt Chamberlain – drums (7-9)
 Joseph Lorge – mixing, engineering
 Patricia Sullivan – mastering
 Andrew J.S. – art direction
 Nicasio Torres – paintings

Charts

References 

2022 albums
Perfume Genius albums
Albums produced by Blake Mills
Matador Records albums
Baroque pop albums
Chamber pop albums
Industrial albums by American artists